Gastón Dalmau Arroquy (born 23 November 1983) is an Argentine actor and singer. He is best known for playing Ramiro "Rama" Ordóñez in the Cris Morena television series Casi Ángeles, and as a member of music group Teen Angels. He lives in Los Angeles.

Personal and media life
Gastón Dalmau was born on 23 November 1983 in Coronel Suárez, Buenos Aires. He has two older brothers. Dalmau cites Charly García as his idol and favourite singer He also plays guitar . Dalmau admires sports such as swimming, tennis and football, and in football he supports Boca Juniors. On September 24, 2019, he announced on his Instagram that he had obtained his US citizenship. He is openly gay, he is in a relationship with Spanish community manager José Navarro.

Filmography

Discography

Theater

References

External links
 https://www.twitter.com/GastondalmauOK
 

1983 births
21st-century Argentine male actors
21st-century Argentine male singers
Argentine male stage actors
Argentine male television actors
Gay singers
Argentine LGBT singers
Argentine gay musicians
Argentine gay actors
People from Coronel Suárez Partido
Argentine expatriates in the United States
Living people